360i was a New York City-based digital agency founded in 1998. It was a business unit of Dentsu.

Corporate history
360i was founded in 1998 in Atlanta by Dave Williams and Bryan Kujawski as a search engine marketing agency and technology company for online brands. It was later acquired by Innovation Interactive. At the time, 360i had 35 people in the agency and 15 people in its SearchIgnite technology business with revenue of close to $5 million.

360i was acquired as a digitally-led communications agency.

Innovation Interactive was acquired by Dentsu in 2010 for $275mm and remains a unit of Dentsu, Inc. Bryan Wiener remained CEO of 360i until February 2014 and was succeeded by Sarah Hofstetter, a 360i executive since 2005 and the founder of the firm's social media and strategy practices. In 2018, Hofstetter was promoted to Chairwoman following Bryan Wiener's move to comScore as CEO. That same year, President Jared Belsky was promoted to CEO, and CMO Abbey Klaassen was promoted to President, New York.

The agency was named a Leader in The Forrester Wave: Performance Marketing Agencies, Q3 2019 and a Leader in The Forrester Wave: Search Marketing Agencies, Q1 2016 report by Forrester Research ." 360i was named a MediaPost OMMA "Digital Agency of the Year" in 2013, 2014, and 2015, and made the Ad Age A List in 2013, 2014, 2015, 2016, 2018 and 2019. In February 2018, 360i was named Adweek's Breakthrough Media Agency of the Year. The agency was also named as one of Campaign's Top 25 Most Influential Agencies in 2019.

In June 2022, Dentsu announced that 360i was being merged with its other creative agencies DentsuMB and Isobar under the Dentsu Creative label, effectively retiring the 360i brand.

Products and services
360i started out as a search engine marketing and optimization company. In 2005 it began offering social media marketing programs. In 2008, the agency rounded out its capabilities in strategy, media and creative. spanning the US, UK, Brazil and Canada.

Notable work from the agency included "Adaptoys", a line of accessible toys that allow those living with paralysis to rejoin playtime,  Oreo's "Dunk in the Dark" social ad that went viral during Super Bowl XLVII, "Westworld: The Maze", HBO's first full-scale voice skill that is compatible with any Alexa enabled device, and "OREO Left-Handers", the first-ever left-handed pack of OREO cookies.

References

External links

 360i.com
 Agency's whitepapers

Marketing companies established in 1998
Advertising agencies based in New York City
Digital marketing companies of the United States
1998 establishments in New York City
Dentsu Aegis Network brands
2010 mergers and acquisitions
American subsidiaries of foreign companies